Into the Wild may refer to:

Music
 "Into the Wild" (LP song), 2012
 "Into the Wild" (Josh Baldwin song), 2020
 Into the Wild (Uriah Heep album) (2011)
 Into the Wild: Live at EastWest Studios (2012), EP by singer L.P.
 Into the Wild Tour (2010–11), by Thirty Seconds to Mars

Book
 Into the Wild (book) (1996), non-fiction book by Jon Krakauer about Chris McCandless
 Into the Wild (film) (2007), directed by Sean Penn, based on the non-fiction book
 Into the Wild (soundtrack) (2007), by Eddie Vedder for the film
 Into the Wild (novel) (2003), novel by Erin Hunter

Television
 Into the Wild (TV series) (2014), directed by Jared Leto, based on a tour by Thirty Seconds to Mars

See also
 Call of the Wild (disambiguation)
 Christopher McCandless